The 1990–91 Ronchetti Cup was the 20th edition of FIBA Europe's second-tier competition for women's basketball clubs, running from 26 September 1990 to 27 March 1991. For the second time the final confronted two teams from the sam country, with Gemeaz Milano beating Pool Comense to become the third team to win the competition.

Qualifying round

Round of 32

Group stage

Group A

Group B

Group C

Group D

Semifinals

Final

References

1990–91
1990–91 in European women's basketball